Robert Norman "Badger Bob" Johnson (March 4, 1931 – November 26, 1991) was an American college, international, and professional ice hockey coach. He coached the Wisconsin Badgers men's ice hockey team from 1966 to 1982, where he led the Badgers to seven appearances at the NCAA Men's Ice Hockey Championships, including three titles. During his time as the head coach at Wisconsin, Johnson also coached the United States men's national ice hockey team at the 1976 Winter Olympics and seven other major championships, including the Canada Cup and IIHF World Championships. He then coached the Calgary Flames for five seasons that included a Stanley Cup Finals loss in 1986. Johnson achieved the peak of his professional coaching career in his only season as coach of the Pittsburgh Penguins in 1990–91, when the Penguins won the 1991 Stanley Cup Finals, becoming the second American-born coach to win it and the first in 53 years. In August 1991, following hospitalization due to a brain aneurysm, Johnson was diagnosed with brain cancer. He died on November 26 of the same year.

Johnson was well known amongst players and fans for his enthusiasm and unflappable optimism, immortalized through his famous catchphrase "It's a great day for hockey!" .

Youth and amateur coaching career 
 
Johnson was born in Minneapolis, Minnesota. He attended Minneapolis Central High School and the University of Minnesota, where he played hockey under legendary coach John Mariucci.

After serving as a medic during the Korean War, Johnson began his coaching career. In 1956, he and Ken Johannson were hired by Warroad High School as teachers and coaches of the boys' hockey team. They had previously been roommates at the University of North Dakota, and neither knew the other was hired to run the team. He later coached hockey at Roosevelt High School in Minneapolis.  He would teach his history class using a hockey stick as a pointer to the chalkboard. Johnson became the head hockey coach at Colorado College in 1963.

In 1966, Johnson moved to the University of Wisconsin–Madison, where he was head coach until 1982. He led the Badgers to seven NCAA tournaments, winning three championships in 1973, 1977, and 1981. It was at Wisconsin where Johnson earned the nickname, "Badger Bob."

Johnson also coached the 1976 Winter Olympic hockey team, the 1981, 1984, and 1987 U.S. teams in the Canada Cup tournament, and the 1973, 1974, 1975, and 1981 U.S. national teams.

NHL coaching career 
In 1982, Johnson began his National Hockey League career when he became the head coach of the Calgary Flames, a position he held for five seasons. In the 1985–86 season, he coached the Flames to the Stanley Cup Finals, where they lost 4 games to 1 to the Montreal Canadiens.  From 1987 until 1990, he served as the President of USA Hockey.  Then in 1990, he was named the head coach of the Pittsburgh Penguins. In his first season, he coached the team, which was led by superstar Mario Lemieux, to a 1991 Stanley Cup Finals championship victory over the Minnesota North Stars, four games to two. That would be his only season coaching the Penguins.

Brain cancer and death
In August 1991, as he was preparing the U.S. team for the upcoming Canada Cup tournament, Johnson suffered a brain aneurysm and was hospitalized, where he was diagnosed with brain cancer. He was then flown on a private plane to Colorado with Dr. Dan Thompson of Mercy Hospital in Pittsburgh.  He began treatment and turned the day-to-day supervision of the Penguins over to his three assistant coaches and Scotty Bowman, the team's director of player development and recruitment, who was named interim head coach. Though the team was "coached by committee", Johnson continued to oversee them from his hospital room by way of videotape and remained in contact by fax machine.

On November 26, 1991, Johnson died of brain cancer in Colorado Springs, Colorado. After his death, his catchphrase was emblazoned on a banner hanging over the ice at the University of Wisconsin–Madison and was painted at the bluelines on the ice in Pittsburgh's Civic Arena. In memoriam, it remained on the ice there for the remainder of the season. In addition, Penguins players would wear a patch on the left sleeve of their jerseys with the word "BADGER" under his birth and death years. "He's such a tremendous person...We would like to win it again for him," said Mark Recchi, a member of the team in 1991.

At the team's 1992 victory celebration at Three Rivers Stadium in Pittsburgh, Bowman's first remark was that "the coach of the Pittsburgh Penguins will always be – Bob Johnson".

The team used "A Great Day For Hockey" as their marketing slogan for the 2008–09 season. On June 12, 2009, exactly 19 years to the day of Johnson's hiring, the Pittsburgh Penguins won their third Stanley Cup. Furthermore, the Penguins won their fourth Stanley Cup, 26 years to the day that Johnson was hired, on June 12, 2016.  "A Great Day For Hockey" now adorns the entrance of the PPG Paints Arena, the current home arena of the Penguins.

At the time of his death Johnson's 234 NHL victories were a record for an American born coach. Dan Bylsma, John Tortorella, Peter Laviolette and  Mike Sullivan have since eclipsed this mark.

Head coaching record

College

NHL

Honors

Johnson was inducted into the Wisconsin Hockey Hall of Fame in 1987, United States Hockey Hall of Fame in 1991, and the Hockey Hall of Fame in 1992. He was elected to the Wisconsin Athletic Hall of Fame in 1993.  On November 2, 2012, the Wisconsin Badgers Men's Hockey team dedicated their home ice rink to Johnson, dubbing it "Bob Johnson Rink".

Personal life
Johnson is also the father of 1980 Olympic hockey gold medalist and current Wisconsin women's hockey coach Mark Johnson and former Wisconsin assistant coach and Toronto Maple Leafs scout Peter Johnson. He is the grandfather of former Wisconsin hockey player Patrick Johnson, former Denver Pioneer hockey player Scott McConnell, Augsburg College men's assistant hockey coach Chris Johnson, and women's hockey player Megan Johnson.

Johnson umpired baseball games in Minnesota with fellow hockey coach Dave Peterson.

See also
 List of members of the United States Hockey Hall of Fame
 List of members of the Hockey Hall of Fame
 List of notable brain tumor patients
 Notable families in the NHL

References

External links

Pittsburgh media coverage of tributes for Johnson

 

1931 births
1991 deaths
American ice hockey coaches
American men's ice hockey forwards
Calgary Flames coaches
Colorado College Tigers men's ice hockey coaches
Deaths from brain cancer in the United States
Hockey Hall of Fame inductees
Ice hockey people from Minneapolis
Ice hockey coaches from Minnesota
Lester Patrick Trophy recipients
Minnesota Golden Gophers men's ice hockey players
Pittsburgh Penguins coaches
Stanley Cup champions
Stanley Cup championship-winning head coaches
United States Hockey Hall of Fame inductees
USA Hockey personnel
Warroad Lakers players
Wisconsin Badgers men's ice hockey coaches
Sports coaches from Minneapolis